Richard Neudecker (born 29 October 1996) is a German professional footballer who plays as a midfielder for 1. FC Saarbrücken in the 3. Liga.

Club career
Neudecker is a youth exponent from 1860 Munich. He played for the second team of the club in the Regionalliga Bayern in the 2014–15 season and most of the 2015–16 season. He made his first appearance for the first team in the second round of the 2015–16 DFB-Pokal on 27 October 2015 against Mainz 05 and subsequently on 1 November 2015 in the 2. Bundesliga against Duisburg.

Having made six appearances in the 2. Bundesliga for 1860 Munich in the 2015–16 season, he joined FC St. Pauli on a free transfer in summer 2016. Three years later he moved to the Dutch VVV-Venlo on a free transfer.

International career
Neudecker made various appearances for the Germany national youth football team.

Career statistics

References

1996 births
People from Altötting
Sportspeople from Upper Bavaria
Footballers from Bavaria
Living people
German footballers
Germany youth international footballers
Association football midfielders
2. Bundesliga players
Regionalliga players
Eredivisie players
3. Liga players
TSV 1860 Munich players
TSV 1860 Munich II players
FC St. Pauli players
VVV-Venlo players
1. FC Saarbrücken players
German expatriate footballers
Expatriate footballers in the Netherlands
German expatriate sportspeople in the Netherlands